The 1984 Vanderbilt Commodores football team represented Vanderbilt University in the 1984 NCAA Division I-A football season. The Commodores were led by head coach George MacIntyre in his sixth season and finished the season with a record of five wins and six losses (5–6 overall, 2–4 in the SEC). , this season represents the last time Vanderbilt beat Alabama.

Schedule

References

Vanderbilt
Vanderbilt Commodores football seasons
Vanderbilt Commodores football